James Francis Lehan  (a.k.a. Mike Lehane) (1856–1946), was a Major League Baseball infielder and outfielder who played for the Washington Nationals of the Union Association in 1884.

External links

1856 births
1946 deaths
Major League Baseball infielders
Baseball players from Hartford, Connecticut
19th-century baseball players
Washington Nationals (UA) players
New Britain (minor league baseball) players